Luis Daniel Martínez Reyes (born September 28, 1994 in Monterrey, Nuevo León) is a Mexican professional footballer who plays for UANL.

External links

Liga MX players
Living people
1994 births
Mexican footballers
Sportspeople from Monterrey
Association football midfielders
Tigres UANL footballers
FC Juárez footballers